Potassium voltage-gated channel subfamily H member 1 is a protein that in humans is encoded by the KCNH1 gene.

Voltage-gated potassium (Kv) channels represent the most complex class of voltage-gated ion channels from both functional and structural standpoints. Their diverse functions include regulating neurotransmitter release, heart rate, insulin secretion, neuronal excitability, epithelial electrolyte transport, smooth muscle contraction, and cell volume. This gene encodes a member of the potassium channel, voltage-gated, subfamily H. This member is a pore-forming (alpha) subunit of a voltage-gated non-inactivating delayed rectifier potassium channel. It is activated at the onset of myoblast differentiation. The gene is highly expressed in brain and in myoblasts. Overexpression of the gene may confer a growth advantage to cancer cells and favor tumor cell proliferation. Alternative splicing of this gene results in two transcript variants encoding distinct isoforms.

Interactions 

KCNH1 has been shown to interact with KCNB1.

Function 
The KCNH1 gene encodes a highly conserved voltage-gated potassium channel with predominant expression in the adult central nervous system.

Pathologies
Gabbett and colleagues described Temple–Baraitser syndrome (TBS) in 2008, naming the condition after English clinical geneticists Profs Karen Temple and Michael Baraitser. They then went on to demonstrate that de novo missense mutations in the KCNH1 gene cause deleterious gain of function in the voltage-gated potassium channel, resulting in the multisystem developmental disorder. TBS is categorized by intellectual disabilities, epilepsy, typical facial features, and aplasia of the nails. Simons et al. demonstrated that mutational mosaicism present in the mothers of some probands was responsible for their children's TBS phenotype. This is further evidence of the role that genetic mosaicism plays in the etiology of neurological disorders.

Type 1 Zimmermann–Laband syndrome was later found to be caused by similar mutations in KCNH1. This has led some researchers to believe that type 1 Zimmermann-Laband and Temple-Baraitser syndromes are different manifestations of the same disorder.

See also 
 Voltage-gated potassium channel

References

Further reading

External links 
 
 
 Human Disease Genes - KCNH1

PAS-domain-containing proteins